The 2017 Kurume U.S.E Cup was a professional tennis tournament played on outdoor carpet courts. It was the thirteenth edition of the tournament and part of the 2017 ITF Women's Circuit, offering a total of $60,000 in prize money. It took place in Kurume, Japan, from 15–21 May 2017.

Point distribution

Singles main draw entrants

Seeds 

 1 Rankings as of 8 May 2017

Other entrants 
The following players received wildcards into the singles main draw:
  Sari Baba
  Mihoki Miyahara
  Haine Ogata
  Suzuho Oshino

The following players received entry into the singles main draw by a protected ranking:
  Kimberly Birrell

The following players received entry from the qualifying draw:
  Rika Fujiwara
  Erina Hayashi
  Ayumi Miyamoto
  Nagi Hanatani

Champions

Singles

 Laura Robson def.  Katie Boulter, 6–3, 6–4

Doubles

 Katy Dunne /  Tammi Patterson def.  Erina Hayashi /  Robu Kajitani, 6–7(3–7), 6–2, [10–4]

External links 
 2017 Kurume U.S.E Cup at ITFtennis.com
 Official website

2017 in Japanese tennis
2017 ITF Women's Circuit
2017